The following events occurred in April 1926:

Thursday, April 1, 1926

The U.S. House of Representatives voted to impeach Judge George W. English for abusive treatment of lawyers and litigants appearing before him.
The Transjordan Frontier Force was formed as a paramilitary border guard for the Emirate of Transjordan.
The Harold Lloyd comedy film For Heaven's Sake premiered.
Born: Charles Bressler, tenor, in Kingston, Pennsylvania (d. 1996); and Anne McCaffrey, writer, in Cambridge, Massachusetts (d. 2011)
Died: Jacob Pavlovich Adler, 71, Russian actor

Friday, April 2, 1926
Inter-communal riots between Hindus and Muslims broke out in Calcutta.
The White House stated that U.S. President Calvin Coolidge was declining the invitation to send any American delegates to a League of Nations conference in Geneva in September to discuss America's reservations about joining the World Court, explaining that the League of Nations and World Court were two separate organizations.
Born: Jack Brabham, racing driver, in Hurstville, New South Wales, Australia (d. 2014)

Saturday, April 3, 1926
Warplanes of Manchurian warlord Zhang Zuolin began bombing Guominjun-held Beijing.
Agip, a petroleum and petrochemical product and sales worldwide, was founded in Italy.  
Born: Gus Grissom, astronaut, in Mitchell, Indiana (d. 1967)

Sunday, April 4, 1926

Greek dictator Theodoros Pangalos won the presidential election with 93.3% of the vote. Turnout was light as the result was considered a foregone conclusion.
Martial law was declared in Calcutta as rioting continued there.

Monday, April 5, 1926
Bulgaria was reported to be in the midst of economic crisis, with businesses failing throughout the country and unemployment around 11%.

Tuesday, April 6, 1926
The Montreal Maroons beat the Victoria Cougars by a 2–0 score to win the Stanley Cup, three games to one.
United Airlines was founded as Varney Air Lines, the first scheduled commercial airline in U.S. history.
Born: Sergio Franchi, tenor, in Codogno, Italy (d. 1990); Gil Kane, comic book artist, in Riga (d. 2000); Ian Paisley, politician, in Armagh, Northern Ireland (d. 2014); Randy Weston, jazz pianist, in New York City (d. 2018)
Died: "The Gentleman Bandit" Gerald Chapman, 38, hanged

Wednesday, April 7, 1926
In Rome, Benito Mussolini was shot by Violet Gibson, daughter of Lord Ashbourne, but the bullets only grazed his nose.
Across Italy, 3 were killed, staffers of anti-Fascist newspapers were beaten, and property was smashed in nighttime "reprisal" attacks following the attempt on Mussolini's life.
Born: Prem Nazir, film actor, in Chirayinkeezhu, British Raj (d. 1989); and Miyoko Asō, voice actress, in Tokyo (d. 2018)
Died: Giovanni Amendola, 43, Italian journalist and politician (died from wounds sustained in an attack by Fascists in July 1925)

Thursday, April 8, 1926
Following a colorful naval ceremony, Mussolini disembarked in a battleship for Tripoli to make his first visit to the colony of Italian Libya, sporting a large bandage across his nose from the previous day's assassination attempt but displaying no other ill effects.

Friday, April 9, 1926
An attempt to start a military coup against Greek dictator Theodoros Pangalos was swiftly crushed in Thessaloniki.
Born: Hugh Hefner, adult magazine publisher (Playboy) in Chicago (d. 2017)
Died: Henry Miller, 67, stage actor and producer

Saturday, April 10, 1926
King Fuad of Egypt inaugurated the new Egyptian Parliament.
Mauna Loa erupted in Hawaii.

Sunday, April 11, 1926
Mussolini arrived in Tripoli to much ceremony and reviewed 3,000 colonial troops.

Monday, April 12, 1926

By a vote of 45–41, the United States Senate unseated Iowa Senator Smith W. Brookhart and seated Daniel F. Steck, after Brookhart had already served for over one year.
Born: Khozh-Akhmed Bersanov, Chechen ethnographer, in Chechen Autonomous Oblast (d. 2018)

Tuesday, April 13, 1926
Lincoln Ellsworth and Roald Amundsen departed from Oslo to Spitzbergen, where they would board the airship Norge to fly over the North Pole. 
In one of the greatest Opening Day pitcher's duels of all time, Walter Johnson of the Washington Senators defeated Eddie Rommel and the Philadelphia Athletics, 1–0 in fifteen innings.

Wednesday, April 14, 1926
Robertson Aircraft Corporation started Contract Air Mail service between St. Louis and Chicago.
Born: 
Frank Daniel, film director, producer and screenwriter, in Kolín, Czechoslovakia (d. 1996)
Gloria Jean, American actress, as Gloria Jean Schoonover, in Buffalo, New York (d. 2018)
George Robledo, footballer, in Iquique, Chile (d. 1989)
Leopoldo Calvo-Sotelo, politician, in Madrid, Spain (d. 2008)

Thursday, April 15, 1926
Residents of Guominjun-held Beijing entered a state of panic as the army of Zhang Zuolin reached Tongzhou, within striking distance of the city. 
Canadian Finance Minister James Robb presented the new budget of King's Liberal government, reporting a $55 million budget surplus and offering $25 million worth of tax cuts as well as reduced tariffs for automobiles.   
Mussolini's visit to Italian Libya concluded.

Friday, April 16, 1926
Zhang Zuolin's army surrounded Beijing as the Guominjun retreated.

Saturday, April 17, 1926
Zhang Zuolin's army entered Beijing.
1,500 railway workers went on strike in London, while nearly 20,000 members of the Women's Guild of the Empire marched through the city to protest against strikes and lockouts as a means of settling labour disputes.
Born: Gerry McNeil, hockey player, in Quebec City (d. 2004)

Sunday, April 18, 1926
Lava from the Mauna Loa eruption engulfed the village of Hoōpūloa.
French and Spanish representatives failed to reach an agreement in talks with Rif rebel delegates in Morocco on ending the ongoing rebellion led by Abd el-Krim.

Monday, April 19, 1926
Canadian Johnny Miles won the 1926 Boston Marathon.
Pitcairn Aviation (now Eastern Air Lines) was formally established. 
Huddersfield Town win the English Football Championship for the third time in succession
Born: Rawya Ateya, politician and first female parliamentarian in the Arab world, in Giza Governorate, Egypt (d. 1997); Frank Brenzel, American War Hero and union activist in Archbald, Pennsylvania (d. 2017)
Died: Sir Squire Bancroft, 84, English stage actor

Tuesday, April 20, 1926

Acting president of China Duan Qirui fled from Beijing to Tianjin; Hu Weide assumed the post. 
The Mellon–Berenger Agreement was negotiated. The pact agreed on the amount and rate of repayment of France's debt to the United States arising from loans and payments in kind made during World War I. The agreement pended ratification in French Parliament.
The French franc hit a new historical low: 30 to the U.S. dollar.
Died: Billy Quirk, 53, American film actor

Wednesday, April 21, 1926

On the traditional anniversary day of the founding of Rome, Italy proclaimed the first annual "Colonial Day", celebrating the Italian colonies. 
Born: 
Elizabeth II, Queen of the United Kingdom, in Mayfair, London (d. 2022)
Arthur Rowley, footballer and cricketer, in Wolverhampton, England (d. 2002)

Thursday, April 22, 1926
Iran and Turkey signed a "Treaty of Friendship" in Tehran. It pledged nonaggression towards one another and also included possible joint actions that could have been taken to deal with groups within their borders that threatened security, particularly Kurds. 
Born: Charlotte Rae, actress and singer, in Milwaukee, Wisconsin (d. 2018); and James Stirling, architect, in Glasgow, Scotland (d. 1992)

Friday, April 23, 1926
Germany reported a trade surplus for March of 240 million marks, in an encouraging sign for the country's financial stabilization and ability to make Dawes Plan payments.

Saturday, April 24, 1926
Germany and the Soviet Union signed the Treaty of Berlin, in which each pledged neutrality in an event of attack on the other by a third party within the next five years.
1926 FA Cup Final: The Bolton Wanderers defeated Manchester City 1–0. 
Born: Thorbjörn Fälldin, 27th Prime Minister of Sweden, in Högsjö (d. 2016)
Died: Emperor Sunjong of Korea, 52

Sunday, April 25, 1926

Rezā Khan was crowned Shah of Iran under the name "Pahlevi".
Born: Gertrude Fröhlich-Sandner, Austrian politician (d. 2008)

Monday, April 26, 1926
Chancellor of the Exchequer Winston Churchill presented the new budget of Stanley Baldwin's Conservative government. It projected a deficit of £8 million, down from £14 million the previous year. The most controversial element was a proposed 5% betting tax to be added to each stake made at a race course or through a bookmaker. 
Born: David Coleman, sports commentator, in Alderley Edge, Cheshire, England (d. 2013); and Michael Mathias Prechtl, artist, in Amberg, Germany (d. 2003)

Tuesday, April 27, 1926
10 were killed as rioting continued in Calcutta.
Seventeen-year-old Mel Ott made his major league debut for the New York Giants, striking out in a pinch-hitting appearance.

Wednesday, April 28, 1926
U.S. President Calvin Coolidge proclaimed the General Grant tree in Kings Canyon National Park in California "the nation's Christmas tree".
Born: Harper Lee, author, in Monroeville, Alabama (d. 2016)

Thursday, April 29, 1926
Riffian rebel envoys in Morocco rejected the latest Franco-Spanish peace proposal to end the Rif War, refusing the condition that Abd el-Krim go into exile.
Born: Paul Baran, computer pioneer, in Grodno, Second Polish Republic (d. 2011)

Friday, April 30, 1926

African-American pilot Bessie Coleman was killed when her Curtiss JN-4 biplane crashed in Jacksonville, Florida.
Final efforts to stave off a lockout of British coal miners failed when the miners rejected the owners' final offer of an average wage cut of 13 percent and a "temporary" workday increase from seven to eight hours.
Born: Edmund Cooper, poet and writer, in Marple, Greater Manchester, England (d. 1982); and Cloris Leachman, actress, in Des Moines, Iowa (d. 2021)
Died: Bessie Coleman, 34, American pilot

References

1926
1926-04
1926-04